Trivium School is an independent Catholic college-preparatory school for boys and girls in grades seven through twelve. It is located in Lancaster, Massachusetts.

Background 

Trivium School was founded in 1979.  Its first headmaster was John S. Schmitt. Schmitt studied education at Harvard University, taught briefly at Colorado Rocky Mountain School and Millbrook School, before founding Thomas More School in Harrisville, New Hampshire in 1959. Mr. Schmitt also taught at Thomas Aquinas College in California from 1974-1979.
The School is named for the trivium, the first three liberal arts (Grammar, Logic, and Rhetoric). The students follow a unified curriculum that includes college preparatory studies with an emphasis on the intellectual virtues. The curriculum is influenced by the ideas of Mortimer J. Adler, Sister Miriam Joseph, and Dorothy L. Sayers in that its stated purpose is to develop the "tools for learning" instead of simply teaching subjects. The stated mission also includes the use of the Socratic method with small classes and a low student-teacher ratio. Students are required to participate in studios of music, visual arts, and drama and sing in the School chorus.

References

External links 
Trivium School Website
Private School Review of Trivium School

Private high schools in Massachusetts
Educational institutions established in 1979
Schools in Worcester County, Massachusetts
1979 establishments in Massachusetts
Catholic secondary schools in Massachusetts